Franz Georg Wilhelm Schüßler (20 January 1911 – 28 September 1942) was an Austrian ice hockey player who competed for the Austrian national team at the 1936 Winter Olympics in Garmisch-Partenkirchen.

Playing career
Schüßler made 15 appearances for the Austrian national team at the 1934 and 1935 World Championships. He played one game for his country at the 1936 Winter Olympics.

He played club hockey for EK Engelmann Wien in the Austrian Hockey Championship.

References

1911 births
1942 deaths
Austrian ice hockey defencemen
Ice hockey players at the 1936 Winter Olympics
Olympic ice hockey players of Austria
Ice hockey people from Vienna
Austrian military personnel killed in World War II